Canarina is a genus of flowering plants within the family Campanulaceae.  They are herbaceous perennial vines with bell-shaped flowers. The best known species is Canarina canariensis from the laurel forests of the Canary Islands which is grown as an ornamental plant.  C. canariensis is one of a group of unrelated Canarian plants that appear to be adapted for bird pollination, including the members of the genera Isoplexis and Lotus. It was once thought that the original pollinators of these plants were sunbirds which had become extinct on the Canary Islands, explaining why some of these species are rare and considered endangered (Vogel 1954; Vogel et al. 1984; Olesen 1985; Valido et al. 2004). However more recent work has shown that these plants are adequately pollinated by non-specialist flower visiting birds, particularly the Canary Islands chiffchaff (Phylloscopus canariensis) and the Canary Island spectacled warbler (Sylvia conspicillata orbitalis) (Olesen 1985; Ollerton et al. 2008), and in fact show some specific adaptations to infrequent pollination by these birds, such as extended flower lifespans (Ollerton et al. 2008), and a hexose-dominated sugar ratio of the nectar (Dupont et al. 2004).

In frost-prone areas, Canarina canariensis is best grown under glass in the winter. It has gained the Royal Horticultural Society's Award of Garden Merit.

Species
Species include:

References

USDA Germplasm Resources Information Network (GRIN): Canarina
Dupont, YL, Hansen, DM, Rasmussen, JT & Olesen, JM (2004) Evolutionary changes in nectar sugar composition associated with switches between bird and insect pollination: the Canarian bird-flower element revisited. Functional Ecology 18: 670–676.
Olesen, JM (1985) The Macaronesian bird-flower element and its relation to bird and bee opportunists.
Ollerton J, Cranmer L, Stelzer R, Sullivan S, Chittka L (2008) Bird pollination of Canary Island endemic plants. Nature Precedings
Valido A, Dupont YL, Olesen JM (2004) Bird-flower interactions in the Macaronesian islands. Journal of Biogeography 31: 1945-1953
Vogel S (1954) Blütenbiologische Typen als Elemente der Sippengliederung. Botanische Studien (Jena) 1:1-338
Vogel S, Westerkamp C, Thiel B, Gessner K (1984) Ornithophilie auf den Canarischen Inseln. Plant Systematics and Evolution 146:225-248

Campanuloideae
Campanulaceae genera
Flora of the Canary Islands